Franco Néstor Calero (born 9 March 1989) is an Argentine professional footballer who plays as a forward.

Calero has played in five of FIFA's six confederations: AFC, CAF, CONCACAF, CONMEBOL and UEFA.

Career
Calero started with Newell's Old Boys from 1993, though never made a senior appearance. He moved to Uruguay with Nacional in 2005 and, months later, Durazno. He scored eight goals in twenty fixtures for the latter in the Segunda División in 2008. The aforementioned year saw Calero join La Liga side Atlético Madrid B; though he wouldn't feature competitively. Further stints in Europe occurred with Zürich (Switzerland) and 1860 Munich (Germany), prior to Calero returning to Argentina with Primera D Metropolitana's Argentino. Twenty-three games and two goals followed. Estudiantes of Torneo Argentino B signed Calero in June 2011.

After just two appearances for Estudiantes, Calero went back to Spanish football with Real Zaragoza B; and subsequently Villarreal B. In the following six months from August 2013, Calero spent time with fellow lower league teams Sariñena and Robres. In 2014, Calero joined Peruvian Segunda División side Alfonso Ugarte. He scored eight goals in a few months with the club. On 14 August, Kissamikos of the Gamma Ethniki in Greece became Calero's fourteenth senior team. Seven goals in fourteen fixtures soon arrived in 2014–15 as they won promotion to tier two. Calero left in 2015, securing a deal with Lebanon's Ansar.

Calero joined Ironi Kiryat Shmona in mid-2015 in Israel, though only played in the Toto Cup against Maccabi Haifa in October. Moves to Rio Claro, Rangers and Unión Rosario came in 2016. Aucas of the Ecuadorian Serie B agreed terms with Calero in early 2017. He netted once over Imbabura, on the way to promotion. Calero had a spell in Angola with Kabuscorp in 2018, before moving to the United States with El Farolito of the NPSL. He appeared in games with Academica, FC Davis and East Bay FC Stompers in his opening months, alongside an eleven-minute cameo in the U.S. Open Cup versus Fresno FC.

To end 2019, Calero had a stint in the Ecuadorian Serie B with Cumbayá FC.

Career statistics
.

Honours
Kissamikos
Gamma Ethniki: 2014–15 Group 4

References

External links

1989 births
Living people
Footballers from Rosario, Santa Fe
Argentine footballers
Association football forwards
Argentine expatriate footballers
Expatriate footballers in Uruguay
Expatriate footballers in Spain
Expatriate footballers in Switzerland
Expatriate footballers in Germany
Expatriate footballers in Peru
Expatriate footballers in Greece
Expatriate footballers in Lebanon
Expatriate footballers in Israel
Expatriate footballers in Chile
Expatriate footballers in Brazil
Expatriate footballers in Ecuador
Expatriate footballers in Angola
Expatriate soccer players in the United States
Argentine expatriate sportspeople in Uruguay
Argentine expatriate sportspeople in Spain
Argentine expatriate sportspeople in Switzerland
Argentine expatriate sportspeople in Germany
Argentine expatriate sportspeople in Peru
Argentine expatriate sportspeople in Greece
Argentine expatriate sportspeople in Lebanon
Argentine expatriate sportspeople in Israel
Argentine expatriate sportspeople in Chile
Argentine expatriate sportspeople in Brazil
Argentine expatriate sportspeople in Ecuador
Argentine expatriate sportspeople in Angola
Argentine expatriate sportspeople in the United States
Primera D Metropolitana players
Torneo Argentino B players
Divisiones Regionales de Fútbol players
Peruvian Segunda División players
Gamma Ethniki players
Lebanese Premier League players
Ecuadorian Serie B players
National Premier Soccer League players
Newell's Old Boys footballers
Club Nacional de Football players
Atlético Madrid B players
FC Zürich players
TSV 1860 Munich players
Argentino de Rosario footballers
Estudiantes de Río Cuarto footballers
Real Zaragoza B players
Villarreal CF B players
CD Sariñena players
CD Robres players
Alfonso Ugarte de Puno players
PGS Kissamikos players
Al Ansar FC players
Hapoel Ironi Kiryat Shmona F.C. players
Rio Claro Futebol Clube players
Rangers de Talca footballers
S.D. Aucas footballers
Kabuscorp S.C.P. players
El Farolito Soccer Club players